Morris Daniel "Mo" McHone (born June 17, 1943) is a former coach for the Sioux Falls Skyforce, a professional team in the NBA Development League. He is also a former NBA basketball coach and assistant coach.

Career

McHone served as an assistant coach for the San Antonio Spurs for several seasons under coach Stan Albeck, replacing him in 1983 when Albeck took a job with the New Jersey Nets.  However, McHone only lasted 31 games, and was fired midway through the season after posting an 11-20 record.  He was replaced by then-GM Bob Bass.

McHone served as an assistant coach for the Cleveland Cavaliers during the  season, and under head coach George Karl during the  season. He also served as an assistant coach for the Detroit Pistons (1999–2001) and the Los Angeles Clippers (2001–2003).

McHone has coached for several teams in the Continental Basketball Association and NBA D-League, and has also served as head coach of the United States Men's National Basketball Team for several stints.

Sioux Falls Skyforce
McHone is best known for his multiple stints as coach of the Sioux Falls Skyforce, both in the Continental Basketball Association (CBA) and the NBA D-League. He coached the team from 1995-1999 in the CBA, and twice (06-07 and 10-12) in the D-League, winning the CBA Championship in 1996. He has a combined 180-124 (.592) record with the Skyforce. However, in August 2012 the Skyforce appointed Joel Abelson as the 15th Head coach of the franchise.

In between his time with the Skyforce, he was named Director of Basketball Development for the Austin Toros of the NBA Development League.

References

External links
 NBA Development League bio
 BasketballReference.com: Morris McHone

1943 births
Living people
American men's basketball coaches
Bradley Braves men's basketball coaches
Continental Basketball Association coaches
Florida State Seminoles men's basketball coaches
Florida State University alumni 
Georgia Bulldogs basketball coaches
Junior college men's basketball players in the United States
New Jersey Nets assistant coaches
San Antonio Spurs head coaches
Sioux Falls Skyforce coaches
United States men's national basketball team coaches
American men's basketball players